I Made Pasek Wijaya (born 5 July 1969 in Denpasar, Bali) is a former player for the Indonesia national football team, he played normally as a midfielder.

Wijaya made several appearances for the Indonesia national football team.

National Team Career 
 1984: Asian Student Cup
 1985: U-17 National Team
 1991–1993: U-23 National Team
 1997–1998: Senior National Team
 1999–2000: Senior National Team

References

External links
 

Indonesian footballers
1969 births
Living people
People from Denpasar
Balinese people
Indonesian Hindus
Indonesia international footballers
Sportspeople from Bali
Southeast Asian Games bronze medalists for Indonesia
Southeast Asian Games medalists in football
Association football midfielders
Competitors at the 1989 Southeast Asian Games